Incognito is a 1937 Danish family film directed by Valdemar Lauritzen and starring Ib Schønberg.

Cast
Ib Schønberg as Olaf Brammer
Arthur Jensen as Butler Eriksen
Else Jarlbak as Diane Jacobsen
Ellen Jansø as Birthe Rømer
Agnes Rehni as Fru Jacobsen
Sigfred Johansen as Frits Holgersen
Johannes Meyer as Direktør A. Schram
Jon Iversen as Komponist Carlo Tangonini
Finn Olsen as Filialbestyrer Kragh
Connie Meiling as Lille Connie
Miskow Makwarth as Ekspedient
Poul Reichhardt as Kriminalbetjent
Valdemar Skjerning as Landsretssagfører
Henry Nielsen as Lirekassemand
Kai Holm

External links

1937 films
1930s Danish-language films
Danish black-and-white films